Neelanshu Chaturvedi (born 5 July 1982) is an Indian politician, from Indian National Congress, and currently serving as MLA from Chitrakoot Constituency in Madhya Pradesh.

Political career
He entered the Vidhan Sabha after a by-election in Chitrakoot in 2017. The seat was vacant due to death of 3 term-MLA Prem Singh, also from the INC.

References

Living people
Madhya Pradesh MLAs 2013–2018
Indian National Congress politicians from Madhya Pradesh
1982 births